Guineos (pronounced ) usually refers to an unripe banana. The term guineo is sometimes used in reference to its ripened counterpart: the yellow (ripened) banana. The word Guineo comes from Guinea, a country in West Africa, as it is one of the places from which bananas originate. Some make a distinction between the two and refer to green bananas as guineos verdes (green bananas) and yellow bananas as guineos (ripe bananas).

Guineos are not to be confused with plantains, which are far starchier than the guineo and cannot be used in the same ways.

Guineos are used widely in Latin American cooking as they are versatile, inexpensive, and filling.

El Salvador 
Bananas, whether green or ripe, are called guineos in El Salvador. Guineos are a popular fruit in the country and are used for the popular dessert 'chocobanano', which is a frozen guineo covered in chocolate, sprinkles, or other toppings.

Puerto Rico 
In Puerto Rico, green bananas are used in dishes such as viandas con ajilimójili, pasteles, sopa de mondongo and sancocho. There are also many other dishes on the island which use green bananas. Green banana flour is widely available throughout Puerto Rico and used for making pancakes, crêpes, waffles, cookies, cakes, tortillas, bread, and other pastries.

Alcapurrias – Classic fitters from Puerto Rico that have gained popularity through parts of Latin America, the Caribbean, and the United States. Green banana and yautía is considered the original alcapurria. The dough can also contain a small amount of squash and potato seasoned with lard, annatto, salt, and garlic. They are filled with the meat of choice and fried. Most traditionally they are filled with picadillo or seasoned corned beef.
Escabeche – Green banana and chicken gizzard pickled in a garlicky brine with bay leaves, garlic, olive oil, onions, olives, and other ingredients.
Dumpling de Guineo – These dumplings are made from grated green banana, green plantain, celery, potato, yautía, mixed with flour or tapioca, milk, eggs, garlic, coriander, and parsley. They are rolled into small balls and deep-fried. They can be prepared a day in advance. The dumplings are made for soups such as asopao de gandules (pigeon peas and dumpling soup), ajo de pollo y huevo (garlic chicken and egg soup), and sopa de guineos (green banana soup).
Gandinga – A thick stew made with pig organs as the main ingredient. Besides pig's heart, kidneys, and liver, this dish is prepared with ingredients such as manzanilla olives, sofrito, and capers. It is recommended to serve gandinga with avocado and boiled green bananas on the side. The dish is important gastronomically in Afro-Puerto Rican culture as slaves were given limited food sources of animal organs and bananas.
Guineo Niño – Also called jibarito envueltos, this dish consists of yellow finger bananas mixed in a batter of flour, baking soda, sugar, vanilla, baking powder, and milk. They are then deep-fried and eaten as banana split or alone. They can also have coconut flakes and spices in the batter added.
Guineos Verdes en Fricasé – Green bananas cooked in a spicy tomato-based fricassee sauce with recaíto, capers, chilies, and olives.
Macabeos – Green bananas boiled and mashed with annatto oil and a small amount of uncooked green banana. They are then filled with the meat of choice, made into small balls, and deep-fried. This crescent-shaped banana fritter is found mainly in the town of Trujillo Alto, which celebrates a macabeo festival each year.
Serenata de Bacalao – Salted cod fish mixed with tropical root vegetables, green bananas, cabbage, chayote, hard boiled eggs, and avocado. The boiled vegetables, green bananas, and chayote are then sauteéd with peppers, plenty of olive oil and vinegar. The cod is shredded and mixed in. The salad is then garnished with coriander, eggs, avocado, and onions.

References

Puerto Rican cuisine
Bananas
Spanish words and phrases